Bradley Skeete (born 17 October 1987) is a British professional boxer. He held the British welterweight title from 2016 to 2017 and the Commonwealth welterweight title in 2016.

Professional career
Born in Tooting, Skeete made his professional boxing debut in October 2010 with a points win against Billy Smith.

In December 2012, he stopped Chas Symonds in four rounds to take the BBBofC Southern Area welterweight title, successfully defending it in March 2013 against Peter McDonagh.

In November 2013, he beat Colin Lynes by unanimous decision to take the English welterweight title. In his next fight he beat Christopher Sebire to take the vacant WBA Inter-Continental welterweight title. He successfully defended the inter-continental title in April 2014, stopping Tobia Giuseppe Loriga in the seventh round.

In November 2014, he faced Frankie Gavin at the ExCel Arena for the latter's British title and the vacant Commonwealth title. The fight went the distance with Gavin getting a controversial unanimous decision, inflicting the first defeat of Skeete's career.

On 28 February 2015, Skeete beat Anzor Gamgebeli to take the vacant WBO European welterweight title, and successfully defended it four months later, stopping Mark Thompson in the third round. He followed this with a second defence against Stevie Williams in November 2015.

In March 2016 he convincingly beat defending champion Sam Eggington to add the British and Commonwealth titles.

On 28 April 2018, Skeete faced Spanish boxer Kerman Lejarraga for the vacant European welterweight title last held by Mohamed Mimoune. He lost the bout by technical knockout in the second round.

Professional boxing record

References

External links

1987 births
Living people
English male boxers
Welterweight boxers
Boxers from Greater London